Schistura gangetica is a species of ray-finned fish in the genus Schistura. It occurs in the Himalayas in Uttar Pradesh where it can be found in pebble bedded streams with a swift current and clear water.

References

G
Fish described in 1987